Sophia Shuell Caldwell Hamilton (born March 22, 1990) is a retired American cross-country ski racer who specialized in sprint disciplines. She won two races and achieved a total of 10 podiums in World Cup competition. Since 2019, Caldwell has been married to fellow US cross-country teammate Simeon Hamilton. On March 22, 2021, aged 31, she announced retirement from competitive skiing.

Biography

Early years
Sophie Caldwell was born in 1990 in the small town of Peru, Vermont, to Lily and Sverre Caldwell. Her paternal grandfather John Caldwell, uncle Tim Caldwell and cousin Patrick Caldwell (Tim Caldwell's son) are all Olympic skiers. Sophie attended the Stratton Mountain School in Stratton, Vermont, a preparatory high school with specialized skiing programs, where her father Sverre was the Nordic Director. She later majored in psychology at Dartmouth College in Hanover, New Hampshire, graduating in 2012. During her college years, she participated in the NCAA skiing championships. After graduating, she continued skiing professionally and joined the SMS T2 team in Stratton.

Athletic career
Caldwell made her debut in FIS Cross-Country World Cup in Quebec's sprints in December 2012 with 14th place in the individual competition. At the 2013 World Ski Championships in Val di Fiemme Caldwell finished 20th in classical style sprint. In 2014 in Lenzerheide, Switzerland, she placed sixth in the freestyle sprint. On March 1, 2014, Caldwell finished third in the Lahti, Finland freestyle sprint World Cup, for her first podium.

At the 2014 Sochi Winter Olympics, she finished sixth in the freestyle sprint. She was in position to contend for a medal midway through the final when Astrid Uhrenholdt Jacobsen poled between her legs, causing her to crash and taking her out of contention for a medal. She finished 12 seconds behind in sixth place. This is the best ever result by a female American cross-country skier.

Caldwell got her first victory in the World Cup during the 2016 edition of the Tour de Ski. She won the classic sprint in Oberstdorf, Germany on January 5, 2016. With this victory, Caldwell was only the second American woman with a victory in the World Cup, the other being Kikkan Randall. Caldwell is also the first American woman to win a classical World Cup event.

Cross-country skiing results
All results are sourced from the International Ski Federation (FIS).

Olympic Games

World Championships

World Cup

Season standings

Individual podiums
 2 victories – (1 , 1 ) 
 10 podiums – (7 , 3 )

Team podiums
 4 podiums – (2 , 2 )

References

External links 

Sophie Caldwell's blog
Sophie Caldwell at usskiteam.com

1990 births
American female cross-country skiers
Cross-country skiers at the 2014 Winter Olympics
Cross-country skiers at the 2018 Winter Olympics
Olympic cross-country skiers of the United States
Dartmouth College alumni
Living people
Sportspeople from Vermont
21st-century American women